The Goya Award for Best Production Supervision (Spanish: Premio Goya a la mejor dirección de producción) is one of the Goya Awards, Spain's principal national film awards. The category was first presented at the second edition of the Goya Awards with Marisol Carnicero being the first winner of the award for her work in Turnip Top (1987).

José Luis Escolar holds the record of most wins in this category with four followed by Esther García, Emiliano Otegui and Andrés Santana with three wins each.

Winners and nominees

1980s

1990s

2000s

2010s

2020s

References

External links
Official site
IMDb: Goya Awards

Goya Awards